Jorge Antônio Dornelles Carpes known as Cassiá (born 14 June 1953 in São Borja) is a retired Brazilian professional football player, who played as defender and a manager.

Career 
He is currently a state representative in Rio Grande do Sul. He graduated to apply for Deputy Governor of the State of Rio Grande do Sul by Solidarity (SD) in Hope coalition that unites the Rio Grande, with the candidate to Ana Amélia Lemos Government, PP.

Began his professional career in the Internacional de São Borja in 1974. Later he played for the teams: Grêmio, Santos, Bahia, Operário-MS, São José-RS, Coritiba, where he finished his career in 1983.

Since 1980s he coached the São Borja, Brasil de Pelotas, Aimoré, Novo Hamburgo, São José-RS, Bagé, Cascavel, Santo André, Lajeadense, Ypiranga-RS, São Luiz, Pelotas, Rio Branco-SP, Grêmio, Portuguesa de Desportos, Bragantino, Juventude, Ponte Preta, Internacional, Figueirense and Criciúma.

Honours

Player
Grêmio
 Campeonato Gaúcho: 1977

Operário-MS
 Campeonato Sul-Mato-Grossense: 1981

Manager
Grêmio
 Campeonato Gaúcho: 1993

References

External links
 Official website

1953 births
Living people
Brazilian footballers
Brazilian football managers
Association football defenders
Campeonato Brasileiro Série A players
Campeonato Brasileiro Série A managers
Campeonato Brasileiro Série B managers
Grêmio Foot-Ball Porto Alegrense players
Santos FC players
Esporte Clube Bahia players
Operário Futebol Clube (MS) players
Esporte Clube São José players
Coritiba Foot Ball Club players
Grêmio Esportivo Brasil managers
Clube Esportivo Aimoré managers
Esporte Clube Novo Hamburgo managers
Esporte Clube São José managers
Esporte Clube Santo André managers
Clube Esportivo Lajeadense managers
Ypiranga Futebol Clube managers
Esporte Clube São Luiz managers
Esporte Clube Pelotas managers
Rio Branco Esporte Clube managers
Grêmio Foot-Ball Porto Alegrense managers
Associação Portuguesa de Desportos managers
Clube Atlético Bragantino managers
Esporte Clube Juventude managers
Associação Atlética Ponte Preta managers
Sport Club Internacional managers
Figueirense FC managers
Criciúma Esporte Clube managers